The 2012 CIS Men's Final 8 Basketball Tournament was held March 9–11, 2012. It was the second of two consecutive CIS Championships to be held at the Halifax Metro Centre before moving to Scotiabank Place in Ottawa for two years. The defending champions were the Carleton Ravens, who won their 7th title in nine years and who return to the tournament with an undefeated record of 31-0 in CIS play. They were joined by six other qualifiers and one wild card team. This was the 50th CIS Men's basketball championship.

The top-seeded Carleton Ravens defeated the second-seeded Alberta Golden Bears by a score of 86-67, winning their second consecutive W. P. McGee Trophy and their record-tying eighth overall. The Ravens are now tied with the Victoria Vikes for most CIS men's basketball championships overall.

The tournament was broadcast by EastLink TV which made the feed available to other cable companies and by NBA TV Canada.

List of participating teams

Championship Bracket

Bronze Medal Bracket

Consolation Bracket

Note: All records are against CIS competition only.

References 

2012
2011–12 in Canadian basketball